Horowitz report may refer to:
The 2018 Inspector General report on FBI and DOJ actions in the 2016 election
The 2019 Inspector General report on the Crossfire Hurricane investigation

See also
Michael E. Horowitz